Shooting became a medal sport in the 1976 Summer Paralympics in Toronto, Canada having previously been a demonstration sport at the International Stoke Mandeville Games. It started off with only three mixed air rifle events (class 1A-1C, class 2-5 and amputees). Canada led the medal table with two golds and one silver while Israel at the Paralympics won one silver and two bronzes.

In the 1980 Summer Paralympics, there were eleven events which included men's and women's air pistol events for amputees debuted. Mixed events included air rifle events with 3-position, kneeling, prone and standing for three classes. The 1984 Summer Paralympics expanded the number of events to 29 events which featured, for the first time, men's team events for 3-position, standing, kneeling and prone, Netherlands won two of the events (3-positions and kneeling), won a silver medal in the prone team and a bronze in the standing team. In the individual events, Australia reigned the sport contest by winning nine gold medals (eight in the women's events by Libby Kosmala and Barbara Caspers who both won four golds each and Allan Chadwick won the men's rifle-prone tetraplegic event). Shooting at the 1988 Summer Paralympics in Seoul, saw three competitors tied for bronze medals which meant there were 25 bronze medals awarded instead of 23. Within the past twelve years, Jonas Jacobsson earned most of his medals within this decade by winning three golds, three silvers and five bronze medals.

The 1992 Summer Paralympics saw the number of events dropped to 16 events as they were back to being mixed events and Germany won the most gold medals by winning five: Johann Brunner won the most medals for his team (one gold and three silvers). In 1996 Atlanta, Thomas Jacobsson won three gold medals and Jonas Jacobsson earned two golds and one bronze for Sweden.

The classes changed to two in the 2000 Summer Paralympics in Sydney: SH1 was for competitors (pistol and rifle) didn't require a standing post and SH2 for competitors who have upper limb disability who need the use of a standing post when competing. Franc Pinter was the first Slovenian shooter to win medals by winning three silver medals between 2000 and 2008. In 2012, Jonas Jacobsson got only two medals: he won gold for 50m rifle 3-positions SH1 and silver in 10m rifle standing SH1 and he earned himself to be one of the best performing male Paralympians to have won the most medals (17 golds, 4 silvers and 9 bronzes).

Medalists

Men's events

Pistol

Rifle

Women's events

Pistol

Rifle

Mixed events

Pistol

Rifle

Team events

See also 
Shooting at the Olympics

References

shooting
Shooting at the Summer Paralympics
Paralympic